The Minneapolis Marriott City Center is a 379-ft (116 m) tall skyscraper in Minneapolis, Minnesota. Completed in 1983 as the Amfac Hotel Minneapolis City Center, it has 32 floors. The building's triangular shape, with the westernmost corner a knife's edge, enhances the illusion that this building is two-dimensional when driving north along Hennepin Avenue. It is the tallest hotel and the 22nd-tallest building in Minneapolis.

Professional wrestler Eddie Guerrero was found dead at this hotel on November 13, 2005 from underlying arteriosclerotic heart disease.

See also
List of tallest buildings in Minneapolis

References

Emporis

Skyscraper hotels in Minneapolis
Hotel buildings completed in 1983
Hotels established in 1983